Caitlin Knowles Myers is a professor of economics at Middlebury College and a Research Fellow of the Institute for the Study of Labor (IZA), known for her recent research on the impact of contraception and abortion policies in the United States. In 2021, when the U.S. Supreme Court agreed to hear the Dobbs vs. Jackson Women's Health Organization case, she led an effort to compile the best economic research on the impact of abortion access on women's lives into an amicus brief, which was signed by more than 150 economists.

Life 
Myers grew up in rural West Virginia and Georgia and trained as a labor economist, receiving her PhD from the University of Texas at Austin in 2005. Myers was widowed in 2011, when her husband, firefighter Adam Myers, was killed in a car accident.

Research 
Myers' research examines issues related to gender, race, fertility and the economy.  In recent work, she has studied the impact of contraception and abortion policy changes.  She has studied the changing influence of education on women's age at motherhood and the impact of abortion access on birth rates.

In work with Daniel Hamermesh and Mark Pocock, Myers studied the effects of time zones on sleep patterns, finding that workers' sleep patterns responded to changes in television schedules and time zone locations.

Selected works

References 

American women economists
21st-century American economists
Middlebury College faculty
University of Texas at Austin alumni
Tulane University alumni
Living people
Labor economists
Year of birth missing (living people)
21st-century American women